Linear Elamite was a writing system used in Elam during the Bronze Age between , and known mainly from a few extant monumental inscriptions. It was used contemporaneously with Elamite cuneiform and records the Elamite language. The French archaeologist  and his colleagues have argued that it is the oldest known purely phonographic writing system, although others, such as the linguist Michael Mäder, have argued that it is partly logographic.

There have been multiple attempts to decipher the script, aided by the discovery of a limited number of multilingual and bigraphic inscriptions. Starting in 2018, Desset outlined some of his proposed decipherments of the script accomplished with a team of other scholars. Their proposed near-complete decipherment was published in 2022, being received positively by some researchers while others remain sceptical until detailed translations of texts have been published.

History 

It is often argued that Linear Elamite is derived from the older Proto-Elamite writing system. The earliest evidence for the use of Linear Elamite script in Susa has been traditionally associated with the rule of king Puzur-inshushinak. He came to power sometime around 2150 BCE.

There's also evidence that the script was used even earlier, such as in 2300 BCE, but this has not been fully confirmed.

The use of Linear Elamite continued after 2100 BCE, and the death of King Puzur-Shushinak, last ruler of the Awan Dynasty in Susa. After his death, Susa was overrun by the Third dynasty of Ur, while Elam fell under control of the Shimashki dynasty, also Elamite of origin.

In 2018, substantial new Linear Elamite texts became available to scholars, which created improved conditions for decipherment. These are the texts associated with the Sukkalmah Dynasty (1900–1500 BCE).

Known texts

Three corpora 
, there are now 51 known texts and fragments written in Linear Elamite. They can be divided into three sub-corpora: the Western Elamite (Lowlands), the Central Elamite (Highlands), and the Eastern Elamite (Elamo-Bactrian).

Western Elamite (Lowlands) 
19 texts are on stone and clay objects excavated in the acropolis at Susa (now kept in the Louvre in Paris). These are now classified as belonging to the Western Elamite (Lowlands) group. Other objects are held at the National Museum of Iran.

Central Elamite (Highlands) 
The Central Elamite (Highlands) group consists of twenty-four inscriptions or fragments (with 1133 signs in total). In 2016, 10 additional Linear Elamite inscriptions were discovered (and published in 2018), some containing nearly 200 signs. These are now classified as belonging to this group.

Eastern Elamite (Elamo-Bactrian) 
The Eastern Elamite group consists of eight short inscriptions, whose lengths range from two and eleven signs.

Older classification 
According to an older classification, Elamite texts were identified by letters A-V.

The most important longer texts, partly bilingual, appear in monumental contexts. One of the best sources of knowledge regarding the Elamite language is the bilingual monument called the "Table of the Lion" currently in the Louvre museum. The monument is written in both Akkadian, which is a known language, and in Linear Elamite. A unique find is item Q, a silver vase found 1.5 kilometers northwest of Persepolis, with a single line of perfectly executed text, kept in the Tehran Museum. There are also a few texts on baked-clay cones (J, K, L), a clay disk (M), and clay tablets (N, O, R). Some objects (A, I, C) include both Linear Elamite and Akkadian cuneiform inscriptions. The bilingual and bigraphic inscriptions of the monumental stairway as a whole, and the votive boulder B have inspired the first attempts at decipherment of Linear Elamite (Bork, 1905, 1924; Frank, 1912). Nine texts have also been found on silver beakers (X, Y, Z, F', H', I', J', K' and L').

Examples

Suspected forgeries 
A few of the short Linear Elamite inscriptions on some unprovenanced objects are suspected of being forgeries. In particular, three brick tablets found at Jiroft are thought to be suspect.

Decipherment 
A very large Elamite language vocabulary is known from the trilingual Behistun inscription and numerous other bilingual or trilingual inscriptions of the Achaemenid Empire, in which Elamite was written using Elamite cuneiform, which is fully deciphered. The Linear Elamite script however, one of the scripts used to write the Elamite language, had remained largely elusive.

Early efforts (1905–1912) 

Two words with similar endings were identified in the beginning of the inscription in the known Akkadian cuneiform (the words "Inshushinak"   and "Puzur-Inshushinak"  ), and correspondingly similar sets of signs with identical endings were found in the beginning of the Elamite part ( and ), suggesting a match. This permitted a fairly certain determination of about ten signs of Linear Elamite:

  Pu-zu-r shu-shi-na-k, King Puzur-Inshushinak.
  I-n-shu-shi-na-k, God Inshushinak.

Further efforts were made, but without significant success.

Silver beakers 
Additional readings were proposed by CNRS associate researcher François Desset in 2018, based on his analysis of several silver beakers that were held in a private collection, and only came to light in 2004. Desset identified repetitive sign sequences in the beginning of the inscriptions, and guessed they were names of kings, in a manner somewhat similar to Grotefend's decipherment of Old Persian cuneiform in 1802–1815. Using the small set of letters identified in 1905–1912, the number of symbols in each sequence taken as syllables, and in one instance the repetition of a symbol, Desset was able to identify the only two contemporary historical rulers that matched these conditions: Shilhaha and Ebarat, the two earliest kings of the Sukkalmah Dynasty. Another set of signs matched the well-known God of the period: Napirisha. This permitted the determination of several additional signs:
  Shi-l-ha-ha, Shilhaha, second king of the Sukkalmah Dynasty.
  E-ba-r-ti, Ebarat II, founder of the Sukkalmah Dynasty.
   Na-pi-r-ri-sha, God Napirisha.

Reading texts 
As of 2020, Desset announced that he and his international team had completed a proposed decipherment of all known inscriptions in Linear Elamite, through deductive work based on the confrontation of known Elamite vocabulary and the recently determined additional letters, and through the analysis of the standard contents of known Elamite texts in cuneiform. Their near-complete decipherment of the script was published in 2022.

New readings include:
  Ha-ta-m-ti, endonym for Elam.

Writing system

Classification 
 argue that Linear Elamite is an alpha-syllabary, which would make it the oldest known purely phonographic writing system. However, they admit that some logograms may have been used, although only rarely and not systematically, arguing that Elamite scribes rejected logographic writing in the 3rd millennium BCE. Other researchers, such as the linguist Michael Mäder, dispute this, arguing that only around 70 percent of Linear Elamite characters are likely to be purely phonographic and that the remainder are logograms, as evidenced by mathematical analyses of Linear Elamite inscriptions. The archaeologist Jacob L. Dahl, who researches the decipherment of Proto-Elamite, has argued that Linear Elamite is not actually a writing system and cannot be deciphered as such, instead suggesting that it is an imitation of writing.

Sign inventories 
Since then, more recent discoveries have allowed more signs to be identified. In 2022, Desset and his colleagues published an updated inventory of 348 Linear Elamite glyphs, corresponding to between 80–110 graphemes, including 72 phonographic signs and their allographic variants, 4 undeciphered infrequent signs, and 33 hapax legomena.

Relationship to other scripts 

Some scholars have suggested that Linear Elamite is derived from the older Proto-Elamite writing system. Desset and colleagues found new evidence for this; they argue that Linear Elamite is an evolution of Proto-Elamite, and that Proto-Elamite evolved, in parallel with Sumerian cuneiform, from a common substrate of simple signs and numerals used with accounting tokens and numerical tablets. He outlined some of their discoveries in public lectures, and formally published them in July 2022. As members of his research team, Desset lists the following scholars: Kambiz Tabibzadeh, Matthieu Kervran, Gian-Pietro Basello, and Gianni Marchesi.

See also 

 Linear A and Linear B
 Trojan script

Notes

References

Bibliography

Further reading 
 
 
 
 Desset, François, "Considerations on the History of Writing on the Iranian Plateau (ca. 3500-1850 BC)", Journal of Archaeology and Archaeometry 1.1, pp. 1-11, 2022

External links
Linear-Elamite on CDLI Wiki
Linear Elamite Text Images at CDLI
Online Corpus of Linear Elamite Inscriptions OCLEI
"Breaking the Code, The Decipherment of Linear Elamite Writing" University of Tehran lecture on 26 January 2021 (video, plus text summary)
Cryptic 4,000-year-old writing system may finally be deciphered  Owen Jarus LiveScience 30 August 22

Bronze Age writing systems
Elamite language
Obsolete writing systems
Syllabary writing systems